Herman Fokker  (10 March 1921, Leiden – 23 August 2001, Capelle aan den IJssel) was a Dutch engineer and politician. As a member of the Reformed Political Party (SGP) he was a member of the Senate from 1959 to 1960. He was also a SGP member of the municipal council of Rhenen from 1978 to 1990.

References 
  Parlement.com biography

1921 births
2001 deaths
20th-century Dutch engineers
Members of the Senate (Netherlands)
Municipal councillors in Utrecht (province)
People from Leiden
People from Rhenen
Reformed Political Party politicians